Globocornidae is a family of gastropods belonging to the subterclass Sorbeoconcha. 

Genera:
 Globocornus Espinosa & Ortea, 2010

References

 Espinosa J. & Ortea J. (2010) Nueva familia, género y especie de molusco gasteropodo (Mollusca: Gastropoda) de las cuevas submarinas de Cuba. Revista de la Academia Canaria de Ciencias 21(3-4): 93-98.
 Bouchet P., Rocroi J.P., Hausdorf B., Kaim A., Kano Y., Nützel A., Parkhaev P., Schrödl M. & Strong E.E. (2017). Revised classification, nomenclator and typification of gastropod and monoplacophoran families. Malacologia. 61(1-2): 1-526

Gastropods
Gastropod families